Polymnia is a genus of American plants in the sunflower family. It is the only genus in the tribe Polymnieae. Several species are known by the common name leafcup.

 Species
 Polymnia aspera  (Mart.) Mart. ex DC. - Mexico
 Polymnia canadensis L. - Ontario, much of eastern + central United States
 Polymnia cocuyensis  Cuatrec. - Boyacá in Colombia
 Polymnia cossatotensis Pittman & V.M.Bates - Arkansas
 Polymnia johnbeckii D.Estes - Tennessee
 Polymnia laevigata Beadle - MO KY TN AL GA FL
 Polymnia quichensis  J.M.Coult. - Costa Rica, Guatemala
 Polymnia sonchifolia  Poepp. - Bolivia
 formerly included
numerous species now in other genera: Axiniphyllum Berlandiera Didelta Guizotia Melampodium Montanoa Rumfordia Smallanthus Sphagneticola Unxia

References

External links
 
 
 Polymnia canadensis - Pictures
 Leafcup - Polymnia canadensis
 Polymnia uvedalia L. - Fotos

Asteroideae
Asteraceae genera
Taxa named by Carl Linnaeus